Alney–Chashakondzha is a volcanic complex located in the northern part of Kamchatka Peninsula, Russia. It consists of two stratovolcanoes: Alney (2598 m) and Chashakondzha (2526 m). Alney is one of the few large stratovolcanoes in the Sredinny Range known to have been active throughout the Holocene, with more than 30 documented pyroclastic deposits.

See also
 List of volcanoes in Russia
 List of ultras of Northeast Asia

References

Mountains of the Kamchatka Peninsula
Volcanoes of the Kamchatka Peninsula
Stratovolcanoes of Russia
Pleistocene stratovolcanoes
Holocene stratovolcanoes